Cook County Board of Commissioners 6th district is a electoral district for the Cook County Board of Commissioners.

The district was established in 1994, when the board transitioned from holding elections in individual districts, as opposed to the previous practice of holding a set of two at-large elections (one for ten seats from the city of Chicago and another for seven seats from suburban Cook County).

Geography
Throughout its existence, the district has represented areas of Chicago Southland.

1994 boundaries
When the district was first established, it represented parts of the southern suburbs of Cook County.

2001 redistricting
New boundaries were adopted in August 2001, with redistricting taking place following the 2000 United States Census.

In regards to townships, the district's redistricted boundaries included portions of the Bloom, Bremen, Lyons, Palos, Rich, Thornton, and Worth townships.

2012 redistricting
The district, as redistricted in 2012 following the 2010 United States Census, strongly resembles the geography it took in its previous, 2001, redistricting.

The district includes parts of Alsip, Bedford Park, Blue Island, Bridgeview, Chicago Heights, Chicago Ridge, Country Club Hills, Crestwood, Dolton, Flossmoor, Ford Heights, Frankford, Glenwood, Homewood, Justice, Lansing, Lynwood, Matteson, Midlothian, Oak Forest, Oak Lawn, Orland Park, Orland Hills, Palos Heights, Palos Hills, Park Forest, Richton Park, Robbins, Sauk Village, South Chicago Heights, South Holland, Steger, Thornton, Tinley Park, and Worth.

In regards to townships and equivalent jurisdictions, it includes portions of the Bloom, Bremen, Lyons, Orland, Palos, Rich, Thornton, and Worth townships.

The district is 119.73 square miles (76,625.33 acres).

Politics
The district, at inception, was originally regarded as a potential "swing district", feasible for either major party to win.

List of commissioners representing the district

Election results

|-
| colspan=16 style="text-align:center;" |Cook County Board of Commissioners 6th district general elections
|-
!Year
!Winning candidate
!Party
!Vote (pct)
!Opponent
!Party
! Vote (pct)
|-
|1994
| |Barclav "Bud" Fleming
| | Republican
| | 
| | Joan Patricia Murphy
| | Democratic
| | 
|-
|1998
| |William Moran
| | Democratic
| | 36,771 (50.40%)
| | Barclav "Bud" Fleming
| | Republican
| | 36,186 (49.60%)
|-
|2002
| |Joan Patricia Murphy
| | Democratic
| |66,238 (100%)
|
|
|
|-
|2006
| |Joan Patricia Murphy
| | Democratic
| |56,814 (73.93%)
| | Michael Hawkins
| | Republican
| | 20,038 (26.07%)
|-
|2010
| |Joan Patricia Murphy
| | Democratic
| |54,227 (65.37%)
| | Sandra K Czyznikiewicz
| | Republican
| | 28,727 (34.63%)
|-
|2014
| |Joan Patricia Murphy
| | Democratic
| |65,796 (100%)
|
|
|
|-
|2018
| |Donna Miller
| | Democratic
| |82,556 (100%)
|
|
|
|-
|2022
| |Donna Miller
| | Democratic
| |55,250 (62.28%)
| | Ana Biedrzycki
| | Libertarian
| | 25,664 (31.72%)

References

Cook County Board of Commissioners districts
Constituencies established in 1994
1994 establishments in Illinois